Irving Operation is a gynaecological operative technique for permanent sterilization in women. It was proposed to reduce the failure rate of Pomeroy procedure for female sterilization. In Irving operation, the proximal part of fallopian tube is buried back into the myometrium, thereby obstructing its lumen.

History
The Irving operation was proposed by Dr. Irving in 1924.

Operation technique
A transverse incision is made on the abdomen and fallopian tube is identified. While holding the fallopian tube with an Allis clamp, a hemostat is used to open the mesosalpinx. Using absorbable sutures, proximal portion of fallopian tube is tied, and a segment of fallopian tube is removed. The proximal part of the fallopian tube is pulled into the defect. The distal portions of the Fallopian tube are ligated and left in place. The abdomen is closed in layers.

Reversal
Irving operation can be reversed with tubal reversal microsurgery. Pregnancy rate after tubal reversal in Irving operation is around 60 percent.

References

Gynecological surgery
Sterilization (medicine)